Joel Matthew Bagan (born 3 September 2001) is a professional footballer who plays for Championship side Cardiff City. Born in England and of Scottish and Irish descent, Bagan plays for the Republic of Ireland U21s.

Club career
Bagan began his career with Southampton before joining Cardiff City during the 2018–19 season. He made his professional debut in a penalty shootout defeat to Reading in the FA Cup on 4 February 2020.

On 14 February 2020, Bagan joined Notts County on a one-month loan deal.

Bagan made his league debut for Cardiff on 21 October 2020 in a 1–1 draw with AFC Bournemouth. He scored his first professional goal against Millwall on 12 February 2022.

International career
Born in England, Bagan is of Scottish and Irish descent. He has represented Scotland at youth level. On 27 August 2021, it was announced that Bagan had switched international allegiance when he was called up to the Republic of Ireland U21 for their 2023 UEFA European Under-21 Championship qualifiers against Bosnia and Herzegovina & Luxembourg. He made his Ireland under-21 debut in a 1–1 draw with Luxembourg at the Stade Jos Nosbaum in Dudelange on 7 September 2021.

Career statistics

References

2001 births
Living people
Footballers from Hampshire
Republic of Ireland association footballers
Republic of Ireland under-21 international footballers
Scottish footballers
Scotland youth international footballers
English footballers
Irish people of Scottish descent
Scottish people of Irish descent
English people of Scottish descent
English people of Irish descent
Southampton F.C. players
Cardiff City F.C. players
Notts County F.C. players
Association football defenders